The Bi-County Conference was a high school conference in western central Illinois. The conference par in athletics and activities in the Illinois High School Association (IHSA). The conference comprised nine public high schools with small enrollments in portions of Fulton, Hancock, Henderson, McDonough,  and Warren counties.

Former membership

Sources:IHSA Conferences and IHSA Member Schools Directory

History
The conference originally consisted of nine schools. It was believed to have been formed in the 1970s at some point. The conference was very competitive. All of these schools were small schools. In the 1990s, La Harpe and Northwestern formed a co-op (the Thunder), which would ultimately cause the demise of the conference. Soon after, Dallas City would leave the conference, as would Roseville; however, the Bi-County would acquire Spoon River Valley and Alexis. 1997-98 was the final year of the conference. La Harpe-Northwestern won the football title that year. As of now, Northwestern and Colchester have consolidated to form West Prairie High School. Avon High School has co-oped with Abingdon High School. Dallas City has consolidated with La Harpe and Carthage to form Illini West High School. Roseville and Monmouth have consolidated to form Monmouth-Roseville High School. Southern High School and Union High School have consolidated to form West Central High School. Yorkwood, Alexis, and Warren have consolidated to form United High School.

References

Illinois high school sports conferences